Play'd: A Hip Hop Story is 2002 television drama film starring Rashaan Nall, Faizon Love, Toni Braxton, Sharissa, Clifton Powell, & Merlin Santana. The film was directed by Oz Scott.

Synopsis
Rashaan Nall stars as rising East Coast rap star Jaxx, who has formed a musical partnership with longtime buddy Mayhem (Merlin Santana). Enter Domino Breed (Faizon Love), ruthless CEO of Da Block Records, a West Coast label. Filling Jaxx's head with promises of solo stardom and innumerable creature comforts (not all of them legal), Domino lures the young performer to California. As he becomes immersed in the gangster lifestyle common to so many of Domino's disciples, Jaxx grows distant from his friends and loved ones, especially his wife Shonda (Toni Braxton), who had originally been in favor of her husband's career move. Inevitably, the greed-dictated rivalry between Jaxx and his former partner Mayhem culminates in tragedy.

Cast
 Rashaan Nall as 'Jaxx'
 Toni Braxton as Shonda
 Faizon Love as 'Domino Breed'
 Clifton Powell as Oz
 Sharissa as Yanesha
 Merlin Santana as 'Mayhem'
 Lawrence B. Adisa as 'Bangs'
 Phillip Bolden as Jimmy 'Little Jimmy'
 Laurence Brown as Benard
 DeRay Davis as Jaxx's Bodyguard
 Chris Pape as Bodyguard
 Jacory Gums as 'Dooz'
 Craig Robinson as Cole
 Enoch Harris as Singer
 Maurice Welch as Singer
 Frankie Richards as Singer
 Dex Elliot Sanders as 'Skeem'

References

External links
 

2002 drama films
American drama television films
Hood films
Films directed by Oz Scott
2002 films
2000s American films
2000s English-language films